František Vaněk (3 December 1931 – 2 September 2020) was a Czech ice hockey player who competed in the 1956 Winter Olympics and in the 1960 Winter Olympics.

Vaněk was born in Uherský Ostroh, Czechoslovakia. He died on 2 September 2020, aged 88.

References

External links

1931 births
2020 deaths
Czechoslovak ice hockey centres
HC Kometa Brno players
Ice hockey players at the 1956 Winter Olympics
Ice hockey players at the 1960 Winter Olympics
Olympic ice hockey players of Czechoslovakia
People from Uherský Ostroh
Sportspeople from the Zlín Region
Czech ice hockey centres
Czech ice hockey coaches
Czechoslovak ice hockey coaches
Czechoslovak expatriate sportspeople in Switzerland
Czechoslovak expatriate ice hockey people